Kitura is a free and open-source web framework written in Swift, developed by IBM and licensed under Apache License 2.0. It’s an HTTP server and web framework for writing Swift server applications.

In December 2019, IBM announced it had no further plans to develop the Kitura framework. As of January 2020, work on server-side Swift was discontinued at IBM. In September 2020, Kitura transitioned to be a community-run project however it struggled to gain traction within the developer community and so is no longer under active development.

Features 
 URL routing (GET, POST, PUT, DELETE)
 URL parameters
 Static file serving
 FastCGI support
 JSON parsing
 Pluggable middleware

See also
 Vapor (web framework)

References

External links

Web frameworks
IBM software